is a Japanese footballer who plays for Kagoshima United FC.

Club statistics
Updated to 23 February 2016.

References

External links

Profile at Kagoshima United FC

1986 births
Living people
Association football people from Shizuoka Prefecture
Japanese footballers
J1 League players
J2 League players
J3 League players
Japan Football League players
Nagoya Grampus players
Tokushima Vortis players
Zweigen Kanazawa players
Kagoshima United FC players
Association football midfielders